The Japanese Elm cultivar Ulmus davidiana var. japonica 'Validation' is a selection made by Kunso Kim and Bethany Brown of the Morton Arboretum released in 2011; propagation is by grafting onto Siberian Elm Ulmus pumila rootstocks.

Description
'Validation' is a vase-shaped tree, the trunk bark smooth and gray. The current year's twigs are light green, contrasting with the previous year's, which are greenish brown.

Pests and diseases
Not known.

Cultivation
The tree is very rare in cultivation beyond the Morton Arboretum.

Accessions
North America
Morton Arboretum, Illinois, US. Acc. No. 22-2008, one plant.
Europe
Grange Farm Arboretum, Lincolnshire, UK. Acc. no. 1126.

References

Japanese elm cultivar
Ulmus articles missing images
Ulmus